This is a list of Members of Parliament (MPs) in the First Protectorate Parliament under the Commonwealth of England which began at Westminster on 3 September 1654, and was held to 22 January 1655.

The preceding Barebone's Parliament was made up almost entirely of County seats. In this the First Protectorate Parliament, many boroughs received back their franchise. However anticipating the Reform Act by nearly 200 years, a number of rotten boroughs were excluded and representation was given to several towns including Manchester, Leeds and Halifax and to the county and city of Durham.

This list contains details of the MPs elected in 1654. Normally when a member is elected for more than one seat a choice is made regarding which seat he represents and an alternative member is chosen for the other. In this parliament however this reseating did not take place, and so some individuals are shown for two or even three seats. It was succeeded by the Second Protectorate Parliament

List of constituencies and MPs

See also
List of MPs elected to the English parliament in 1656 (Second Protectorate Parliament)
List of MPs elected to the English parliament in 1659 (Third Protectorate Parliament)
List of parliaments of England
First Protectorate Parliament

Notes

References

17th-century English parliaments
1654
 
1654 in England
1654 in politics
 List
The Protectorate